China National Highway 567 runs from Lixian to where it meets G345 in Changba, Kangxian. Large parts of the route are relabeled from Gansu provincial highways S205 and S219. G7011 Shiyan–Tianshui Expressway runs parallel to the road on several sections. It is one of the new trunk highways proposed in the China National Highway Network Planning (2013 - 2030).

See also
 China National Highways

References

Transport in Gansu